Montetinea is a genus of moths belonging to the family Tineidae.

Species

Montetinea montana  G. Petersen, 1957
Montetinea tenuicornella  (Klimesch, 1942)

References
Markku Savela's ftp.funet.fi

Tineidae
Tineidae genera